Martin Campbell Field is a general aviation airport located near Copperhill, Tennessee. It serves the Copper Basin region in which it is located, as well as the entirety of Polk County and surrounding areas.

Facilities and aircraft
Martin Campbell Field consists of a 3,500 ft x 75 ft asphalt runway. Martin Campbell Field was established in December 1946.

See also
List of airports in Tennessee
Chilhowee Gliderport

References

Airports in Tennessee
Buildings and structures in Polk County, Tennessee
Transportation in Polk County, Tennessee
Airports established in 1946
1946 establishments in Tennessee
Copper Basin (Tennessee)